Aleksander Foosnæs (born 5 June 1994) is a Norwegian footballer.

Career
Foosnæs started his career at Ranheim as a junior and then moved to Rosenborg. Foosnæs went back to Ranheim in 2014.

Foosnæs made his debut for Ranheim in Eliteserien in a 4-1 win against Stabæk. On 8 January 2020, Foosnæs signed a two year contract with Bodø/Glimt.

Career statistics

Club

Honours

Club
Bodø/Glimt
Eliteserien (1):  2020

References

1994 births
Living people
People from Malvik
Norwegian footballers

Ranheim Fotball players
FK Bodø/Glimt players
IL Stjørdals-Blink players
Eliteserien players
Norwegian First Division players
Association football defenders
Sportspeople from Trøndelag